Cadix is a commune in the Tarn department in southern France.

Exposed to an oceanic climate, it is drained by the Tarn river and various other small rivers.

See also
Communes of the Tarn department

References

Communes of Tarn (department)